Ladypool Primary School (formerly Stratford Road School) is a 3–11 mixed, community primary school in Sparkbrook, Birmingham, West Midlands, England. It is a Grade II* listed building, and stands next to St Agatha's Church.

History 
It was built as Stratford Road School in 1885 by architects Martin & Chamberlain as a Birmingham board school, one of around forty schools built by that firm in an innovative style as a result of the Elementary Education Act 1870.

The school was extensively damaged by the Birmingham tornado on 28 July 2005 and lost its distinctive Martin & Chamberlain tower. The school proposed building a replica of the tower. On 26 October 2006, Birmingham City Council Planning Department decided that the planning application should be referred to the Department for Communities and Local Government.

Gallery

References 

 Pevsner Architectural Guides - Birmingham, Andy Foster, 2005, 
 Victorian Architecture in Britain - Blue Guide, Julian Orbach, 1987, 
 Planning application for the reconstruction of tower

External links 
 

Primary schools in Birmingham, West Midlands
Community schools in Birmingham, West Midlands
Grade II* listed buildings in the West Midlands (county)
Educational institutions established in 1885
1885 establishments in England